is a Japanese television drama series based on the non-fiction novel by Hidemine Takahashi.

Kazunari Ninomiya, who is a member of the idol group Arashi, played the lead role. Kasumi Arimura played a supporting role as a manager for the High School Baseball Team. It premiered on NTV on 12 April 2014, and received the viewership rating of 9.9% on average.

Cast
 Kazunari Ninomiya as Aoshi Tamo, a high school teacher
 Kumiko Asō as Riko Tone, sports magazine writer
 Kasumi Arimura as Yuzuko Tarumi, a manager of the baseball team
 Hiroko Yakushimaru as Kaede Tarumi, Yuzuko's mother
 Sota Fukushi as Kimiyasu Akaiwa, a baseball team member
 Yuto Nakajima as Tsuyoshi Shirao, a baseball team member
 Kento Yamazaki as Kōki Ebato, a baseball team's captain
 Kanata Hongō as Shunichi Kamezawa, a baseball team member
 Katsuhiro Suzuki as Masami Kashiyama, a baseball team member
 Ichikawa Ebizō XI as Kentarō Yachida, a former member of the baseball team
 Dori Sakurada as Eisuke Shikata, a baseball team member

Episodes

References

External links
  
 
 

Japanese drama television series
2014 in Japanese television
2014 Japanese television series debuts
2014 Japanese television series endings
Nippon TV dramas
Television shows based on Japanese novels